Adrián Cañas Ortiz (born 17 June 1992) is a Spanish footballer who plays for Internacional de Madrid CF as a midfielder.

Club career
Cañas was born in Madrid, and finished his formation with Getafe CF. He made his senior debuts with the reserves in the 2010–11 campaign, in Segunda División B.

Cañas made his professional debut on 16 December 2010, starting and being booked in a 1–0 home win against BSC Young Boys for the season's UEFA Europa League. He would spend the majority of his spell with the Juvenil and with the B-team, however.

On 25 July 2011 Cañas signed a two-year deal with another reserve team, Real Valladolid B in Tercera División. He subsequently represented clubs in his native community, appearing for AD Alcorcón B, RCD Carabanchel and Internacional de Madrid CF.

References

External links

1992 births
Living people
Footballers from Madrid
Spanish footballers
Association football midfielders
Segunda División B players
Tercera División players
Getafe CF B players
Getafe CF footballers
Real Valladolid Promesas players
AD Alcorcón B players
Internacional de Madrid players